This is a list of 20th-century American women composers ordered alphabetically by surname.

A
 Esther Allan (1914–1985)
 Beth Anderson (born 1950)
 Elinor Armer (born 1939)
 Clarice Assad (born 1978)
 Lera Auerbach (born 1973)
 May Aufderheide (1888–1972)

B
 Elaine Barkin (born 1932)
 Floy Little Bartlett (1883–1955)
 Amy Beach (1867–1944)
 Eve Beglarian (born 1958)
 Carla Bley (born 1938)
 Margaret Bonds (1913–1972)
 Radie Britain (1899–1994)
 Rosemary Brown (1916–2001) 
 Canary Lee Burton (born 1942)

C
 Gloria Coates (born 1938)
 Nellie Weldon Cocroft (1885–1986)
 Valerie Coleman
 Sylvia Constantinidis (born 1962)

D
 Katherine Kennicott Davis (1892–1980)
 Emma Lou Diemer (born 1927)

E
 Marti Epstein (born 1959)
 Reena Esmail (born 1983)

F
 Sylvia Fine (1913–1991)
 Vivian Fine (1913–2000)

G
 Miriam Gideon (1906–1996)
 Annie Gosfield (born 1960)

H
 Juliana Hall (born 1958)
 Barbara Harbach (born 1946)
 Melissa Hui (born 1966)
 Jennifer Higdon (born 1962)

K
 Laura Karpman (born 1959)

L
 Joan La Barbara (born 1947)
 Anne La Berge (born 1955)
 Vanessa Lann (born 1968)
 Libby Larsen (born 1950)
 Tania León (born 1943)

M
 Linda Martinez (1975–2005)
 Josephine McGill (1877–1919)
 Cindy McTee (born 1953)
 Missy Mazzoli (born 1980)
 Meredith Monk (born 1942)

O
 Pauline Oliveros (1932–2016)

P
 Judith Palmer
 Florence Price (1887–1953)

R
 Nancy Raabe (born 1954)
 Shulamit Ran (born 1947)

S
 Laura Schwendinger (born 1962)
 Amy Scurria (born 1973)
 Ruth Crawford Seeger (1901–1953)
 Alex Shapiro (born 1962)
 Judith Shatin (born 1949)
 Faye-Ellen Silverman (born 1947)
 Netty Simons (1913–1994)
 Linda Catlin Smith (born 1957)
 Cristina Spinei (born 1984)
 Pauline Anna Strom (1946–2020)

T
 Augusta Read Thomas (born 1964)
Karen P. Thomas (born 1957)
 Joan Tower (born 1938)

V
 Lois V. Vierk (born 1951)

W
 Melinda Wagner (born 1957)
 Gwyneth Van Anden Walker (born 1947)
 Wang Jie (born 1980)
 Edwina Florence Wills (1915–2002)
 Diane Wittry
 Julia Wolfe (born 1958)

Z
 Pamela Z (born 1956)
 Ellen Taaffe Zwilich (born 1939)

References

American Women Composers

Lists of women by occupation
Lists of American musicians
Composers
 
Lists of composers by nationality
Lists of women in music
composers